The History Mix Volume 1 is the sixth studio album by English duo Godley & Creme, released in 1985 by Polydor Records. The album was a remix of songs spanning the career of Godley & Creme and their earlier bands, 10cc, Doctor Father and Hotlegs.

Overview
The album produced two singles, "Cry" and a remix of "Golden Boy", the former which became a groundbreaking music video featuring numerous "changing faces" that cross-faded from one to another as they mimed the lyrics to the song.

"Wet Rubber Soup" was also made into a video, which was effectively a collage of snippets from Godley and Creme's past work. "Cry" is featured at the end, with a version of the video slightly different from the single version – one part shows Lol Creme 'morphing' into Gonzo from the Muppets.

In an interview in Musician magazine in 1985, Lol Creme said: "We're not in the music business. We left it in 1976 and we haven't taken it seriously since. We decided to celebrate our 25 years together by taking all the music we've ever done – demos, masters, whatever – and putting it in a musical blender, the Fairlight [CMI]. Then we got J. J. [Jeczalik] of Art of Noise to reprogram the sounds to a disco beat so we could dance at our party."

Release
The album was originally released in a number of variants depending on the format and territory. The core version of the album consists of 2-3 tracks which was released as a UK LP. For the international release the second side of the LP was replaced with previously released songs. For the CD release the original UK track listing was combined with the international version tracks.

The album was reissued as "History Mix Vol. 1...Plus" which added tracks from "Cry", "Golden Boy" and "Snack Attack" singles to the core album version.

Track listing
 "Wet Rubber Soup" – 12:25
 Recycled from: "Rubber Bullets" (Kevin Godley, Lol Creme, Graham Gouldman), "Life Is a Minestrone" (Creme, Eric Stewart), "I'm Not in Love" (Gouldman, Stewart), various excerpts from Consequences (1977)
 "Cry" (Godley, Creme) –  6:32
 "Expanding the Business / The 'Dare You' Man / Hum Drum Boys in Paris / Mountain Tension" – 17:03
 Recycled from: "Business Is Business" (Godley, Creme), "How Dare You" (Godley, Creme), "Neanderthal Man" (Godley, Creme, Stewart), "This Sporting Life" (Godley, Creme), "One Night in Paris" (Godley, Creme), "The Dean and I" (Godley, Creme), "Sand in My Face" (Godley, Creme, Gouldman), "Umbopo" (Godley, Creme)

International LP version
 "Wet Rubber Soup" / "Cry" – 18:52
 "Light Me Up" (Godley, Creme) – 4:30
 "An Englishman in New York" (Godley, Creme) – 5:52
 "Save a Mountain for Me" (Godley, Creme) – 3:34
 "Golden Boy" (Godley, Creme) – 5:48
Additional track on the US and Canadian release

International CD version
 "Wet Rubber Soup" / "Cry" – 18:52
 "Expanding the Business / The 'Dare You' Man / Hum Drum Boys in Paris / Mountain Tension" – 17:03
 "Light Me Up" – 4:30
 "An Englishman in New York" – 5:52
 "Save a Mountain for Me" – 3:34
 "Golden Boy" – 5:48
Additional tracks on the Japanese reissue

History Mix Vol. 1...Plus version
 "Wet Rubber Soup" – 12:26
 "Cry" – 6:33
 "Expanding the Business / The "Dare You" Man / Hum Drum Boys in Paris / Mountain Tension" – 17:07
 "Cry (Single Edit)" – 3:54
 "Love Bombs" – 3:55
 "Snack Attack" (Godley, Creme) – 6:52
 "Wet Rubber Soup (Edit)" – 3:27
 "Golden Boy (Remix)" – 5:49
 "Light Me Up" – 4:28
 "Golden Boy" (12" Mix) – 4:57

Personnel
 Kevin Godley
 Lol Creme
 Nigel Gray
 J. J. Jeczalik  
 Trevor Horn
 Eric Stewart
 Graham Gouldman

References

External links
 

1985 albums
Godley & Creme albums
Albums produced by Trevor Horn
Albums produced by Graham Gouldman
Albums produced by Nigel Gray
Polydor Records albums